William DeKova White (born January 28, 1934) is an American former professional baseball first baseman. He played in Major League Baseball (MLB) for the New York / San Francisco Giants, St. Louis Cardinals, and Philadelphia Phillies. He was an eight-time All-Star and seven-time Gold Glove winner, who earned a championship as a top contributor in the  World Series.

In 1989, White was elected President of the National League to replace Bart Giamatti, who succeeded Peter Ueberroth as Commissioner. White served as NL president until he retired in 1994.

White became a full-time sportscaster after his playing career ended in 1969, and was the play-by-play man and color analyst for New York Yankees television and radio broadcasts for 18 years.

Education
White graduated from Warren G. Harding High School in Warren, Ohio in 1952, and was both president and salutatorian of his class. He then stayed in-state to attend Hiram College from 1953 to 1955. In both high school and college, White lettered in baseball, basketball, and football.

Playing career

As a minor-leaguer, White was the second black American to play for a Carolina League team – the Danville Leafs (1953). Percy Miller Jr. broke the color barrier for that league in 1951.

In his 13-season major league career, White batted .286 with 202 home runs and 870 RBIs in 1,673 games. His best statistical year came in 1963, when he posted career highs with 200 hits, 106 runs scored, 27 home runs, and 109 RBIs. White was a consistent performer, particularly during the 1962-64 seasons. During those three seasons, he had highly productive and notably consistent numbers for hits (199, 200, 191), runs (93, 106, 92), home runs (20, 27, 21), runs batted in (102, 109, 102), and average (.324, .304, .303). During the 1964 Cardinals championship season, White placed third in the league MVP voting for his overall seasonal performance, yet had a subpar postseason, batting only .111 (3–27 with 2 RBI) in the World Series. A capable baserunner, White stole 12 or more bases four times. He was also one of the top defensive first basemen of his time, winning seven straight Gold Glove Awards (1960–66). White hit for the cycle on August 14, 1960 and once hit three home runs in a game, on July 5, 1961. Also in July 1961, White tied Ty Cobb's 49-year Major League record by collecting 14 hits in consecutive doubleheaders, both against the Chicago Cubs at Sportsman's Park, going 4-for-5 in both games on July 17 and 3-for-4 in both games the very next day. Ironically, the first doubleheader was played on the same day Cobb died, and 49 years to the day that Cobb collected eight hits to begin his feat.

Broadcasting career

White earned a sports program on KMOX radio in St. Louis while he was still playing for the Cardinals. Following a trade to the Phillies, he did a program there.  After ending his playing career, White became a sportscaster for WFIL-TV (now WPVI-TV) in Philadelphia, concurrent with the launch of the station's long-running Action News format.  While in Philadelphia, White became the first African-American to broadcast NHL games when he called several games of the Philadelphia Flyers.

In 1971, White joined the New York Yankees' broadcast team. He called Yankee games from 1971 to 1988, most often teamed with Phil Rizzuto and Frank Messer. White did the team's broadcasts on both radio and television during most of that stretch. White was the first regular black play-by-play announcer for a major-league sports team.

On New York City radio, White was featured on WMCA from 1971 to 1977, after which the Yankees switched over to WINS. In 1981, the Yankee broadcast team moved over to WABC.  On television, White worked with Rizzuto and Messer on WPIX.

Nationally, White helped call several World Series for CBS Radio (and ) and did sports reports for the network. White worked as a Monday Night Baseball announcer for ABC television in the late 1970s. He also did pre-game reports for ABC's coverage of the Yankee Stadium games in the 1977 World Series, and handled the post-game trophy presentation for the network after the Yankees clinched the world title in the sixth game.

WPIX and its usual Rizzuto-Messer-White broadcast trifecta carried the ALCS in 1976, 1977, 1978, 1980 and 1981, providing New York viewers a local alternative to the nationally broadcast telecasts. The most famous highlight with White on play-by-play was the Bucky Dent three-run home run during the one-game playoff between the Yankees and Red Sox in 1978 on WPIX.

Outside of baseball, White was also part of the coverage of the Winter Olympic Games in 1980 and 1984.

The Yankee organization showed their appreciation following his years in the broadcast booth when they selected him to receive their Pride of the Yankees Award in 1990.

National League president and retirement
White was elected to replace Giamatti as National League president in 1989 in a unanimous vote, becoming the first black executive to hold such a high position in sports. He served as NL president through 1994. In his autobiography, he later expressed the concern that he had about having been more of a figurehead while NL president, but also said that he managed to accomplish some of the goals that he originally had when he took the job.

For several years, beginning just after his retirement from the NL, White was a member of the Veterans Committee of the Baseball Hall of Fame. White, along with fellow newcomers to the committee Yogi Berra, a longtime Phil Rizzuto teammate, and Rizzuto's top rival and stand-out shortstop for the perennial pennant-winning NL Brooklyn Dodgers, Pee Wee Reese, were noted for having helped swing the vote in favor of the Yankee shortstop's candidacy during their first year on the committee.

In 2011, White released his autobiography entitled Uppity: My Untold Story About the Games People Play. 

On May 22, 2020, White was elected to the St. Louis Cardinals Hall of Fame along with Tom Herr and John Tudor.
White currently resides in Upper Black Eddy, Pennsylvania.

See also

 Home run in first Major League at-bat
 List of Major League Baseball players to hit for the cycle
 List of St. Louis Cardinals team records
 St. Louis Cardinals Hall of Fame Museum

References

Further reading
 Bill White - Baseballbiography.com

External links
, or Retrosheet

1934 births
Living people
African-American baseball players
African-American sports executives and administrators
American sports executives and administrators
Baseball players from Florida
Gold Glove Award winners
Hiram Terriers baseball players
Major League Baseball broadcasters
Major League Baseball executives
Major League Baseball first basemen
National Hockey League broadcasters
National League All-Stars
National League presidents
New York Giants (NL) players
New York Yankees announcers
People from Walton County, Florida
Philadelphia Flyers announcers
Philadelphia Phillies players
San Francisco Giants players
St. Louis Cardinals players
American expatriate baseball players in the Dominican Republic